The 1985 McDonald's All-American Boys Game was an All-star basketball game played on Saturday, April 13, 1985 at the Moody Coliseum in University Park, Texas. The game's rosters featured the best and most highly recruited high school boys graduating in 1985. The game was the 8th annual version of the McDonald's All-American Game first played in 1978.

1985 game
The game was telecast by ESPN. 1985 was the first year in which the McDonald's game was televised. The East team had 3 North Carolina commits (Bucknall, Lebo and Madden) and two of the top ranked centers of the 1985 class, Danny Ferry and Pervis Ellison. The West team had many forwards, including Ed Horton and Tony Kimbro, and center Tito Horford, a heavily recruited center born in the Dominican Republic. 
During the game Walker Lambiotte scored 24 points 10 for 12 from the field and 4 for 7 from the free throw line, winning the MVP award. Terry Dozier and Danny Ferry scored 17 points, and Mark Stevenson had 16; for the West team, Lowell Hamilton and Tito Horford both scored 13 points, while Ed Horton had 12. Of the 25 players, 15 went on to play at least 1 game in the NBA.

East roster

West roster

Coaches
The East team was coached by:
 Head Coach Ed Kershner of Osceola High School (Kissimmee, Florida)

The West team was coached by:
 Head Coach Bill Green of Marion High School (Marion, Indiana)

All-American Week

Contest winners 
 The 1985 Slam Dunk contest was won by Michael Porter.

References

External links
McDonald's All-American on the web
McDonald's All-American all-time rosters
McDonald's All-American rosters at Basketball-Reference.com
Game stats at Realgm.com

1984–85 in American basketball
1985
1985 in sports in Texas
Basketball competitions in Texas